Kimberleyeleotris is a genus of fishes in the family Eleotridae endemic to Australia, where they are only known from rivers in the Kimberley region of Western Australia.

Species
The recognized species in this genus are:
 Kimberleyeleotris hutchinsi Hoese & G. R. Allen, 1987 (Mitchell gudgeon)
 Kimberleyeleotris notata Hoese & G. R. Allen, 1987 (Drysdale gudgeon)

References

 
Freshwater fish genera
 
Kimberley (Western Australia)
Taxonomy articles created by Polbot